Museum of World Costumes is a museum of  original folk clothings from various countries. Established in 2011, it is located in Büyükçekmece district ofIstanbul Province.

The museum was established in a restored historic building situated at Çarşı St. 4 in the Mimar Sinan neighborhood of Büyükçekmece district in Istanbul Province by the municipality in 2011. The original folk costumes, accessories and some related objects were donated by various foreign folk dance groups, who participated at the "International Culture and Art Festival" held annually in Büyükçekmece, which was four times awarded by the International Council of Organizations of Folklore Festivals and Folk Arts. 

The museum is open between 8:30 and 17:00 local time except Thursdays and Sundays. Admission is free of charge.

References

Museums in Istanbul
Museums established in 2011
2011 establishments in Turkey
Büyükçekmece
Folk costumes
Ethnographic museums in Turkey